The 2009–10 Southern Professional Hockey League season was the sixth season of the Southern Professional Hockey League.  The season began October 22, 2009, and ended April 17, 2010, after a 56-game regular season and a six-team playoff.  The Huntsville Havoc captured their first SPHL championship.

Preseason
The Richmond Renegades and Twin City Cyclones franchises folded during the off-season.  The Louisiana IceGators, Mississippi Surge, and Pensacola Ice Flyers joined the league, after each of those markets had recently lost an ECHL team.

Regular season

Final standings

‡  William B. Coffey Trophy winners
 Advanced to playoffs

Attendance

President's Cup playoffs

* indicates overtime game.

Finals
All times are local (CDT)

Awards
The SPHL All-Rookie team was announced March 25, 2010, followed by the All-SPHL teams on March 26, Rookie of the Year on March 29, Coach of the Year on March 30, Defenseman of the Year on March 31, Goaltender of the Year on April 1, and MVP on April 2.

All-SPHL selections

References

Southern Professional Hockey League seasons
Southern Professional